Mowlan-e Sofla (also Romanized as Mowlān-e Soflá; also known as Sūlān) is a village in Mehmandust Rural District, Kuraim District, Nir County, Ardabil Province, Iran. At the 2006 census, its population was 11, in 6 families.

References 

Tageo

Towns and villages in Nir County